Progressive Constitutionalist Party may refer to:

Progressive Constitutionalist Party (Malta)
Progressive Constitutionalist Party (Mexico)
Czech Constitutionalist Progressive Party, Austria-Hungary

See also
Progressive Party (disambiguation)